Loir Botor Dingit (died 2005) was a rattan farmer and Paramount Chief from Indonesia. He was awarded the Goldman Environmental Prize in 1997 for his efforts on forest protection.

References

Indonesian environmentalists
Tribal chiefs
Indonesian farmers
2005 deaths
Year of birth missing
Goldman Environmental Prize awardees